Leonardo Tiozzo (born 28 May 1994 in Rome, Italy) is an Italian dressage rider. He represented Italy at the 2014 World Equestrian Games in Normandy and at the 2015 European Dressage Championships in Aachen.

His current best championship result is 15th place in team dressage at the 2014 World Equestrian Games while his current best individual result is 53rd place at the 2015 Europeans.

References

Living people
1994 births
Italian male equestrians
Italian dressage riders
Sportspeople from Rome